Ignacio Pussetto  (born 21 December 1995) is an Argentine professional footballer who plays as a winger or forward for Italian  club Sampdoria, on loan from EFL Championship club Watford.

Club career

Atlético de Rafaela
Born in Cañada Rosquín, Santa Fe, Pussetto began his career in the youth ranks of local club Juventud Unida before joining Atlético de Rafaela in 2011. In 2013, Pussetto made his professional debut for Atlético de Rafaela in the Argentine Primera División. On 1 June 2015, Pussetto scored his first goal with Rafaela in a 3–2 loss to Huracán. On 30 August 2015, Pussetto scored the lone goal for Rafaela in a 1–0 victory over Sarmiento de Junin.

Huracán
On 18 July 2016, Pussetto was sold to Huracán for $1.4 million, after rejecting offers from Vélez and Unión. On 29 October 2016, Pussetto scored his first goal for Huracán in a 1–1 draw with Rosario Central. On 11 September 2017, Pussetto led his club to a 1–0 victory over Newell's Old Boys, scoring the loan goal of the match. The following week, on 18 September, Pussetto scored two goals for Huracán in a 3–1 victory over Gimnasia y Esgrima La Plata at Estadio Juan Carmelo Zerillo, the first victory for Huracán in that venue in 31 years.

Udinese
On 17 July 2018, Pussetto signed with Serie A club Udinese for a fee of around €8 million.

Watford
On 14 January 2020, Pussetto signed a four-and-a-half year deal with Watford for £7 million.

On 5 October 2020, Pussetto returned to Udinese on a season-long loan. On 30 June 2021, the loan to Udinese was extended for the 2021–22 season.

On 1 September 2022, Pussetto joined Sampdoria on loan with an option to buy. He also signed a contract with Sampdoria until 2026, which will be in effect if Sampdoria exercises their purchase option.

Personal life
Pussetto's older brother, Alfredo, is also a professional footballer.

Career statistics

References

External links
profile futbol360.com.ar

1995 births
Living people
Argentine footballers
Argentine expatriate footballers
Association football midfielders
Association football forwards
Atlético de Rafaela footballers
Club Atlético Huracán footballers
Udinese Calcio players
Watford F.C. players
U.C. Sampdoria players
Argentine Primera División players
Serie A players
Premier League players
English Football League players
Argentine expatriate sportspeople in England
Argentine expatriate sportspeople in Italy
Expatriate footballers in England
Expatriate footballers in Italy
Sportspeople from Santa Fe Province